The 2021–22 Championnat National 2 was the 24th season of the fourth tier in the French football league system in its current format. This season the competition was contested by 64 clubs split geographically across four groups of 16 teams. The teams include amateur clubs (although a few are semi-professional) and the reserve teams of professional clubs.

Teams
On 15 July 2021, the FFF ratified the constitution of the competition, and published the groups.

Due to the non-completion of the 2020–21 season, the FFF declared that there would be no regular promotion or relegation from the division, and that any vacancies to be filled would be done on the basis of finishing positions in the 2019–20 season.

Changes from 2020–21 season are as follows:

 Sedan were promoted to Championnat National to replace SC Lyon, who finished bottom of 2020–21 Championnat National, and were relegated according to the rules of that competition. SC Lyon will play as Lyon La Duchère in Championnat National 2 this season.
 Bourges 18 and Bourges Foot merged to form Bourges Foot 18, resulting in a vacancy.
 Gazélec Ajaccio were administratively relegated to Championnat National 3 for financial reasons, a decision which was confirmed on appeal, resulting in a vacancy.
 Vacancies were to be filled by Lille (res) and Vitré as best 14th placed teams in the 2019–20 season. However, Lille (res) declined to take up the position, and were replaced by Montpellier (res).

Impact of COVID-19 on the season
The start of the season was impacted by postponements due to the COVID-19 pandemic in France. Three opening day games in Group C were postponed due to COVID-19 cases at Saint-Priest, Martigues and Aubagne.

The game-week three game between Nantes (res) and Angers (res) was postponed on the preceding Wednesday due to COVID-19 cases at Angers.

League tables

Group A

Group B

Group C

Group D

Top scorers

Season outcomes

Promotion
Versailles, Martigues, Paris 13 Atletico and Le Puy were champions of each group, and were promoted to 2022–23 Championnat National, subject to the usual ratification by the FFF and DNCG.

Relegation
Romorantin, Plabennec, Vitré, Schiltigheim, Lens (res), Entente SSG, Monaco (res), Rumilly-Vallières, Marseille (res), Montpellier (res), Colomiers and Mont-de-Marsan finished in the relegation places, and were relegated to 2022–23 Championnat National 3, subject to any reprieves detailed in the next section.

Reprieves
Any reprieves required due to administrative relegations, mergers or clubs folding will be decided by taking, in order, the 14th placed clubs ranked by order of their record against clubs finishing 9th to 13th position in their group, followed by the 15th placed clubs ranked by order of their record against clubs finishing in 10th to 14th position in their group.

On 14 June 2022, the DNCG announced that Béziers were to be relegated to Championnat National 3 for the 2022–23 season, due to financial mismanagement. The decision was upheld on appeal, and  Romorantin were reprieved from relegation.

References

2021-22
4
Fra